2SM is an Australian radio station, licensed to and serving Sydney, broadcasting on 1269 kilohertz on the AM band. It is owned and operated by Broadcast Operations Group. 
The SM call sign is taken from the initials of Saint Mary's.

2SM's programs are heard across the 2SM Super Radio Network in regional New South Wales and Queensland, consisting of 32 AM and FM stations.

2SM unveiled its renowned denim zipper logo in 1975. Although the logo is inextricably linked to 2SM, it was, according to radio historian Wayne Mac, actually created for Brisbane pop station 4IP by a company called Eagle Marketing and subsequently adopted by other stations including 2SM, 3XY and 2NX.

History 

James Meany, a parish priest at St Mark's Drummoyne, raised the finances to allow Archbishop Michael Kelly to form the Catholic Broadcasting Co. Ltd, which obtained a licence for radio 2SM in 1931. The station was opened by Archbishop Michael Kelly on 24 December 1931, owned by the Roman Catholic Church. Religious programming was, for most part, not its focus (except for the regular Question Box program of Dr Rumble) but not surprisingly, for most of its life 2SM followed a conservative line in its programming and was promoted as "The Family Station".

In 1958 2SM moved to premises at 257 Clarence Street, Sydney but for the next five years it maintained its conservative family-oriented style. At the time, the station was run by General Manager Bill Stephenson, who started his radio career at 2UE in the 1940s before moving to 2SM in the 1950s. In September 1963 Stephenson oversaw a radical overhaul of 2SM's format when the station finally commenced 24-hour service. In those days it was still common for radio and TV stations to close in the late evening and, as many readers will recall, this practice persisted in commercial television well into the 1970s. 2SM was relaunched as a Top 40 station, featuring Australia's first team of disc jockeys, dubbed "The Good Guys"—a US radio inspired format subsequently copied by 3AK, 5KA, 6PR and others. This set the trend for years to come, with 2SM relying heavily on adapting of formulaic programming strategies sourced from American commercial radio, which in turn were then picked up by other stations around the country.

Searching for an alternative, in early 1967 2SM became the first station in the country to adopt the new "talkback" technology which enabled presenters for the first time to broadcast phone conversations with members of the public. In November 1968 2SM reverted to an all music format. In 1969 2SM aggressively fought to regain the youth audience it had lost to 2UW. During 1970 2SM established itself as one of the most promotionally active and innovative commercial stations. Rod Muir successfully transplanted the American "More Music" format to Sydney, making minor adaptations for the Australian market. With stringent format policies applying to music flow, commercial content, what announcers said and the placement of jingles, 2SM redefined the whole premise of music based radio in Australia. Key to the More Music philosophy was a strictly limited, high rotation play list of around 30 songs and which at peak times reputedly included as few as 15 songs in one three-hour shift. The new format had several significant effects. First and foremost, it brought to an abrupt end the days of the true "personality" DJs, as exemplified by 2UW's Ward "Pally" Austin and 3XY's legendary Stan "The Man" Rofe. The rigid formatting restricted the on-air presentation, replacing it with a highly affected, American-style presented by a largely faceless and interchangeable roster of "rock jocks". But even more significantly, the "More Music" format took programming decisions out of the hands of DJs and put them into the hands of consultants and back room programming executives.

From around 1970 until the mid-1980s, 2SM dominated Sydney commercial radio. At its peak in the late-1970s it was the highest rating and most profitable station in the history of Australian radio. It epitomised and defined commercial AM Top 40 radio practice around the country for fifteen years and long after 2SM itself lost popularity, its successful programming formula was still influencing its FM band successors.

The introduction of new AM station, 2WS, in 1978, and FM stations 2Day and Triple M at the start of the 1980s saw 2SM's glory days end. In the early 1980s the station retained reasonable ratings with contemporary music formats and slogans such as "More Music", "Rock of the 80s" and "The Power". In 1988 the station dropped its Top 40 format as well as the 2SM brand when it became "Lite & Easy 1269". Its final rating as a Top 40 station had been 6.9%. The years since have seen its format undergo numerous changes, including easy listening and country formats (KICK AM). The ratings never again surpassed 4%.

In the 1990s, the station regained its original callsign (2SM) and recorded some of the lowest ratings ever by a Sydney commercial radio station. In February 1992 a commercial syndicate headed by John Brown attempted to purchase the station. In July the station was finally sold to Wesgo, who sacked the entire on air staff and put the station into automation. Wesgo relaunched the station with a country music format in October. With the station still last place in the ratings, it went back to easy listening in May 1994, adopting the new name Gold 1269 and by Survey 8 1994 hit the heights of 7.1%. In late 1994 Wesgo was purchased by Australian Provincial Newspapers, who later purchased the Australian Radio Network in March 1995, requiring some stations to be sold due to media ownership rules. The station was sold to Kick Media, headed by former INXS manager, Chris Murphy. It was rebranded Kick AM in mid-October with a format comprising country, rock and blues. RG Capital Radio Network bought a 40% stake in February 1996. By the end of 1996 the station still had low ratings, causing the owners to relaunch it on Christmas Eve 1996 as The New 2SM, with a format of hits from the 60s to 80s.

In 2002 the night time show, hosted by Graeme Gilbert, scored a rating of just 0.1%, the lowest rating ever recorded for a commercial program in a metro market in Australia. 2SM subsequently withdrew from the Sydney radio ratings.

From 1980 until 1984, 2SM owned a 34% shareholding in Brisbane television station TVQ.

Line-up
Monday-Friday
Talk Overnight with Dave Sutherland (Monday to Wednesday 12am to 5am)
Breakfast with Richard King (5am to 9am)
Mornings with John Laws (9am to 12pm)
Afternoons with Brent Bultitude (12pm to 3pm)
Talkin' Sport (3pm to 6pm)
Sportsday NSW (6pm to 8pm)
Talk Tonight with Graeme Gilbert (8pm to 12am)

Weekends
Gary Stewart (Thursday and Friday 12am to 5am, Saturday and Sunday 12am to 4am)
Hi-Tide Fishing Show (Saturday and Sunday 4am to 7am)
Off The Hook (Saturday 7am to 8am)
Pete Davis (Saturday 8am to 12pm)
Inside The Ropes (Saturday 12pm to 1pm)
The Clubhouse (Saturday 1pm to 2pm)
Tim Lynn (Saturday 2pm to 6pm)
Football Nation (A-League) (Friday, Saturday and Sunday afternoons / evenings / nights)
Carter Edwards (Saturday and Sunday 6pm to 12am)
Reel Adventures (Sunday 7am to 8am) 
Dean Mackin (Sunday 8am to 12pm)
Behind The Wheel (Sunday 12pm to 1pm)
Drivers Seat (Sunday 1pm to 2pm)
Dave Cochrane (Sunday 2pm to 6pm)

2SM airs news bulletins every hour and half-hourly during breakfast.

References

External links
2SM 1269AM

Radio stations established in 1931
Radio stations in Sydney
News and talk radio stations in Australia
Broadcast Operations Group
1931 establishments in Australia